Head for the Shallow is the debut album from heavy metal/sludge metal band Big Business, released on January 25, 2005 by Hydra Head Records.

Track listing
"O.G." – 4:21
"Focus Pocus" – 5:19
"White Pizazz" – 4:38
"Stareadactyl" – 2:59
"Easter Romantic" – 5:09
"Technically Electrified" – 3:47
"Eis Hexe" – 4:05
"Off Off Broadway" – 5:17

References 

2005 debut albums
Big Business (band) albums
Hydra Head Records albums
Albums produced by Phil Ek